The Microdot is a concept design by William Towns for a small, economical town car. The car was first shown at the 1976 London Motor Show and was an evolution of his 1972 Minissima car. The Microdot was a petrol/electric hybrid vehicle with a small 400cc petrol engine powering a 3.5kW generator and, designed to carry three people side-by-side on short city journeys, with the driver sitting in the central position.

Mallalieu Engineering
In 1979 William Towns collaborated with prototype vehicle builders at Mallalieu Engineering, Wootton, Abingdon, Oxfordshire, with a view to limited production. The Microdot prototype, built by William Towns on a cut-down Austin Mini chassis, was given opening doors and a  longer nose, to accommodate the aluminium Reliant car engine, one of the smallest and lightest UK car engines then available, instead of the original hybrid proposal. Mallalieu Engineering was best known for making Bentley Specials, the Barchetta and Oxford, based on the Mark 6 Bentley. 

The engineers had a target of 100 miles per Imperial gallon. Under the prototype label of "Matrix" a business plan, it was proposed by Mallalieu's managing director Noel Hodson, to sell several hundred "Chelsea" Microdots a year to POSSFUND, the venture-capital arm of the Post Office pension fund, then one of the largest funds in the world, managed by Ralph Quartano.

The recession of the early 1980s, and the growth in small economical cars such as the Austin Metro and Ford Fiesta, stopped the hybrid-drive project. Mallalieu Microdot (company number 01504509) was dissolved on 23 June 1987 and Mallalieu Engineering (company number 01215691) was dissolved in 1989, and the project disappeared.

Design
Designers from film special-effects studios in London, who had created the original Star Wars spaceship interiors, created "alive" interior cockpit designs and motor industry experts from Lucas and Ever Ready advised on batteries, power-trains and instruments. Relying on 8-track stereo tape recordings by celebrities, it was planned that a Microdot would "talk" to its owner.

References

Heritage Motor Centre

External links

Concept cars
Microcars
Electric concept cars
Hybrid electric cars
Cars of England